The Samoa Cup is a Samoan domestic football tournament held each year since 2010 (excluding 2012). The most recent winners of the tournament were Kiwi FC in the 2014 edition.

Past winners

The cup returned in 2018, with the National League teams placed into five different zone teams. Manu-fili were the winners as the top team of the round-robin.

Performances

References

 
Football competitions in Samoa
National association football cups